John L. Lancaster was president of the Texas and Pacific Railway during the first half of the 20th century.

References

People from Marshall, Texas
Year of birth missing
Year of death missing